Da Sound is the debut album by Swedish dance-Pop band Da Buzz. It was released on September 21, 2000 through Edel Records The album peaked at #16 for 10 weeks at the Swedishcharts.

Two singles, "Do You Want Me"  and "Let Me Love You", reached the top ten on the Swedish charts, while the latter song became a dance club hit in the U.S., peaking at number four on the Dance Club Play chart in Billboard magazine.

In 2021, Dutch Eurodance act Twenty 4 Seven (essentially producer Ruud van Rijen) covered "Do You Want Me" with TV presenter Nance Coolen on vocals (also the vocalist on many of Twenty 4 Seven's early 1990s hits).

Track listing 
 "Let Me Love You" (3:41)
 "Do You Want Me" (3:40)
 "Give You All My Love" (3:53)
 "Your Love Will (Shine On Me)" (3:41)
 "Paradise" (3:15)
 "Tell Me Once Again" (3:27)
 "Believe in Love" (3:32)
 "Love and Devotion" (3:19)
 "I Wanna Be Free" (3:21)
 "I'm Alright" (3:26)
 "Out of Words" (3:54)

References 

2000 debut albums
Da Buzz albums